Kyakhtinsky District is an administrative and municipal district (raion), one of the twenty-one in the Republic of Buryatia, Russia. It is located in the south of the republic. Its administrative center is the town of Kyakhta. As of the 2010 Census, the total population of the district was 39,785, with the population of Kyakhta accounting for 50.3% of that number.

Geography
The district is located in southern Buryatia, near the Mongolia–Russia border, in the geographical region of the Selenga Highlands.

History
The district was established on December 12, 1923.

Administrative and municipal status
Within the framework of administrative divisions, Kyakhtinsky District is one of the twenty-one in the Republic of Buryatia. It is divided into one town (an administrative division with the administrative center in the town (an inhabited locality) of Kyakhta), one urban-type settlement (an administrative division with the administrative center in the urban-type settlement (inhabited locality) of Naushki), eight selsoviets, and five somons, all of which comprise forty rural localities. As a municipal division, the district is incorporated as Kyakhtinsky Municipal District. The town (together with one rural locality—the settlement of Sudzha) and the urban-type settlement are incorporated as two urban settlements, and the eight selsoviets and five somons are incorporated as fifteen rural settlements within the municipal district. The town of Kyakhta serves as the administrative center of both the administrative and municipal district.

References

Notes

Sources

Districts of Buryatia
States and territories established in 1923
